Langell Valley, previously known as Langell's Valley, was an unincorporated community in Klamath County, Oregon, United States, located along Langell Valley Road.  There are currently only a couple of small houses located there, and no businesses or services.

History
The community (and the valley) were named after settler Arthur Langell. Its post office operated in many locations from December 11, 1871, to March 15, 1930. Langell Valley is now served by the Bonanza post office.

References

Unincorporated communities in Klamath County, Oregon
1871 establishments in Oregon
Populated places established in 1871
Unincorporated communities in Oregon